Iftikhar Hussain Ansari  (26 April 1942 – 30 September 2014), widely known among his followers as Moulvi Sahib, was a Kashmiri Shia cleric, politician, businessman and a proponent of the Grand Ashura Procession In Kashmir. He was a representative of Ruhollah Khomeini and other maraji’. He was a towering Islamic scholar in India and had close relations with multiple other important scholars such as Sayyid Jawad Shahristani, Mohammad Alavi Gorgani and Lotfollah Safi Golpaygani. He succeeded his father Muhammad Jawad Ansari as president of the All Jammu and Kashmir Shia Association in Jammu & Kashmir in 1962, a position which he held for life.  He was a sitting member of Jammu and Kashmir's Legislative Assembly for the Jammu and Kashmir People's Democratic Party; he was earlier a member of the National Conference and Congress.

Assassinations
Ansari was thrice the target of unsuccessful assassination attempts. In June 2000, Ansari barely escaped the explosion of a landmine while addressing a religious congregation at Gund Khwaja Qasim. The blast killed twelve of his followers. On 1 September 2000, Ansari was injured by an IED explosion that killed two policemen and a driver. Police suspected the Hizbul Mujahideen.

Death
Ansari died at his residence in Dar ul Jawad, Qamarwari, Srinagar on the morning of 30 September 2014 after a prolonged liver illness. Ansari had been undergoing specialized treatment in the United States. Various political, religious and social leaders offered condolences. Almost more than two hundred thousand people attended his funeral, from qamarwari to Zadibal imambargah where namaz e jenazah was offered. He was buried in his ancestral graveyard, Baba Mazar, Alamgari Bazar, Zadibal, Srinagar.

References

External links

1943 births
2014 deaths
Indian Shia Muslims
Jammu and Kashmir Peoples Democratic Party politicians
Indian National Congress politicians
Jammu & Kashmir National Conference politicians
Jammu and Kashmir MLAs 1983–1986
Jammu and Kashmir MLAs 1996–2002
Jammu and Kashmir MLAs 2002–2008
Jammu and Kashmir MLAs 2008–2014